The 1997 World Wushu Championships was the 4th edition of the World Wushu Championships. It was held at the Palazzo dello Sport in Rome, Italy from November 3 to November 8, 1997. For the countries in Asia, this was the qualification for the 1998 Asian Games.

Medal summary

Medal table

Men's taolu

Men's sanda

Women's taolu

References 



World Wushu Championships
Wushu Championships
World Wushu Championships, 1997
1997 in wushu (sport)
Wushu in Italy
November 1997 sports events in Europe